Cyclin-Y is a protein that in humans is encoded by the CCNY gene.

References

External links

Further reading